The following is a timeline of the history of the city of Bursa, Turkey.

Prior to 14th century 
 183 BCE – Prusa founded by Prusias I of Bithynia.
 76 BCE – Bithynia becomes part of Roman Empire.
 730 CE – Hagios Stephanos (church) built.
 947 CE – City besieged by forces of Sayf al-Dawla of Aleppo.
 1097 – Seljuqs in power (approximate date).
 1204
 City besieged by French forces led by Pierre de Bracheux and Payen d'Orleans.
 City becomes part of the Nicaean Empire.

14th–18th centuries 
 1326 – Siege of Bursa; city becomes capital of Ottoman Empire.
 1331 – Traveller Ibn Battuta visits city.
 1335 – Alaeddin Bey Mosque built.
 1339 – Orhan Camii (mosque) built.
 1385 - Hüdavendigar Mosque completed.
 1395 – Bayezid I Mosque built in Yıldırım.
 1399 – Ulu Cami (mosque) built.
 1402 – City besieged by Timurids.
 1413 – City besieged by Karaman forces.
 1421
 Yesil Mosque and Yesil Türbe (mausoleum) built.
 Green Mosque, Bursa built.
 1424 – Madrasa built.
 1426 – Muradiye Complex built.
 1442 – Irgandi Bridge built near city.
 1453 – Capital of Ottoman Empire relocates from Bursa to Istanbul.
 1487 – Population: 40,000.
 1490 – Koza Han (caravansary) built.
 16th C. – Mayor Synagogue (Bursa) built (approximate date).
 1512 – Ala ed-Din in power.
 1552 – Yeni Kaplica (bath) built.
 1607 – City besieged by Kalenderogli.
 1674 – Inebey Madrasa built in Tahtakale.

19th century 
 1801 – Fire.
 1802 – Fire.
 1804 – Emir Sultan Mosque rebuilt.
 1814 – Sultan Abdülmecid visits city.
 1823 – Population: 60,000 (approximate).
 1845 – Isiklar Military High School established.
 1852 – Brotte hotel in business.
 1855 – 28 February: Earthquake.
 1864 – Gumuslu Kumbet (Silvered Tomb) rebuilt.
 1869
 Hamidiye Technical School opens.
 Bursa newspaper begins publication.
 1875 – Orphanage founded.
 1879 – Ahmet Vefik Pasha Theater built.
 1883 – Egyptians in power.
 1891 – Mudania-Bursa railway begins operating.

20th century 
 1902
 Bursa Archaeological Museum established.
 The export of silk in 1902 valued at £620,000.
 1904 - Bursa Museum of Turkish and Islamic Art established.
 1910 – Population: 75,000.
 1920 – City taken by Greek forces.
 1923 – City becomes part of the newly formed Republic of Turkey.
 1929 - Bursa Museum of Turkish and Islamic Art relocated.
 1932 – Tayyare theatre opens.
 1944 – Military airport established.
 1945 – Ant newspaper begins publication.
 1949 – Ormancı gazetesi newspaper begins publication.
 1950
 Hakimiyet milletindir newspaper begins publication.
 Population: 103,812.
 1951 – İşçi sesi newspaper begins publication.
 1952 – Gece postası newspaper begins publication.
 1953 – Milletyolu newspaper begins publication (approximate date).
 1962 – International Bursa Festival begins.
 1963 – Bursaspor football club formed.
 1970 – Maarif Koleji (Education College) established.
 1972 – Archaeological Museum of Bursa opens.
 1973
 Atatürk Museum established.
 Population: 318,209 city; 426,567 urban agglomeration (approximate).
 1974 – Tofaş Sports Club formed.
 1975
 Bursa University established.
 Turkish and Islamic Works Museum established in the Yesil complex.
 1979 – Bursa Atatürk Stadium opens.
 1984 – Population: 535,500 (estimate).
 1989 - Bursa Forestry Museum opened.
 1996 – Population: 1,211,688.
 1998
 Bursa State Symphony Orchestra founded.
 Bursa International Fair Building constructed.
 2000
 Yenisehir Airport begins operating civilian flights.
 Borçelik headquarters building constructed.

21st century 

 2002
 Bursaray metro transit begins operating.
 Bursa Book Fair begins (approximate date).
 2008 – Wholesale Grocer and Fish Market, and Merinos Cultural Centre built.
 2010 – Bursa Technical University established.
 2011
 Bursa Orhangazi University established.
 Population: 1,704,441.
 2012 - Bursa Energy Museum established.
 2016 – 2016 Bursa bombing
 2017 - Population: 2,936,803 (estimate, urban agglomeration).

See also 
 Timelines of other cities in Turkey: Ankara, Istanbul, Izmir

References 

This article incorporates information from the German Wikipedia and Turkish Wikipedia.

Bibliography 

Published in 19th century
 
 
 
 
 
 
 

Published in 20th century
 
  (+ 1854 ed.)
 
 
 
 
 
 
 
 
 
 
 

Published in 21st century

External links 

 Europeana. Items related to Bursa, various dates.
 

 
bursa